Prislop Pass, is a mountain pass in northern Romania, connecting the historical regions of Maramureş and Bukovina over the Rodna Mountains, in the Eastern Carpathians.

The Prislop Pass is situated at an elevation of 1,416 meters. The closest city is Borșa.

See also
 List of highest paved roads in Europe
 List of mountain passes

References

External links
Pasul Prislop

Mountain passes of Romania
Mountain passes of the Carpathians